The N2 road is a national primary road in Ireland, running from Dublin to the border with Northern Ireland at Moy Bridge near Aughnacloy, County Tyrone to connect Dublin with Derry via the A5. A section of the route near Dublin forms the M2 motorway.

Route 
The N2 commences at junction 5 of the M50 motorway. It then runs as a dual-carriageway for 17 km (10.5 miles) from the M50 to north of Ashbourne, County Meath. This project was opened on 25 May 2006, and includes 3.5 km (2.2 miles) of three lane dual carriageway built to motorway standard. The route is the first to have a 120 km/h (75 mph) special speed limit (this was previously reserved for motorways, see Road speed limits in the Republic of Ireland for particulars). 13 km (8.1 miles) of this dual carriageway stretch became motorway on 28 August 2009. (see M2 motorway).

The route continues through Balrath towards Slane, where a dangerous bridge brings the road through the town by the historic Hill of Slane, now home to the occasional rock festival. The N2 continues through Collon in County Louth. Just after Ardee the N2 meets the N33, which connects the N2 to the nearby M1 motorway. North of this, in County Monaghan, the N2 bypasses Carrickmacross to the east, along a bypass opened on 31 January 2005. This 9 km wide single carriageway has been named The Kavanagh Way, after Monaghan writer and poet Patrick Kavanagh. The route by-passes Castleblayney and Clontibret on the way to Monaghan. North of Monaghan town, the N12 diverges east to the border. The N2 continues north through Emyvale to reach the border at Moy Bridge directly south of Aughnacloy, County Tyrone. From here, the road becomes the A5 road to Omagh and Derry.

Upgrades 
Projects completed on the N2 include a 16 km (10 miles) 2+1 bypass of Castleblayney, which opened on 5 November 2007 . A 3 km (1.9 miles) single carriageway bypass of Monaghan town to the east was opened on 25 September 2006 by Pat Gallagher, Junior Minister For Transport.

Previous planned projects along the N2 included a 4 km (2.5 miles) bypass of Ardee and a 6 km (3.7 miles) bypass of Slane. These projects have now been incorporated into a single project which extends from the end of the Ashbourne Bypass to north of Ardee (N2 Ashbourne to Ardee). The feasibility report for this scheme recommends a dual carriageway cross section. That section of the N2 from the end of the Castleblayney Bypass to the NI Border at Aughnacloy is also being studied (N2 Clontibret to NI Border).

Discussion 
There have been calls (by both Republic of Ireland and Northern Ireland political parties) to upgrade the whole Dublin-Derry route to dual carriageway, including the A5 in Northern Ireland. However, there was no mention of the N2 road being upgraded to motorway standard in the Republic. The Irish Department of Finance website confirmed on 22 March 2007 that £400 million had been set aside for Northern investment to include a dual carriageway to Derry and Donegal. It was unclear if any of this would be built in the Republic.

The 2007 Fianna Fáil election policy document on transport included a dual carriageway from Dublin to Letterkenny/Derry as one of Fianna Fáil's promises if re-elected. Although the N2 was not included in Transport 21 and the Monaghan and Carrickmacross by-passes are single lane national primary roads, a feasibility report completed on the N2 Ashbourne to Ardee section recommended a dual carriageway cross section (including the Slane By-pass). Also, in order to tie in with the A5 Western Transport Corridor north of the border, work on the feasibility study for the N2 Clontibret to NI Border Scheme was commenced.

The National Roads Authority (NRA) encourages hauliers heading north to Derry to use the M1 as far as the N33 road to Ardee, avoiding the dangerous sections of the parallel N2 in the environs of Slane, Collon and Ardee.

M2 motorway 

On 30 September 2008, it was announced that a 13 km (8.1 miles) section of the current N2 from Killshane to Ashbourne was under consideration for re-designation to motorway standard. Public consultation finished in December 2008.

On 14 July 2009, it was announced that the 13 km (8.1 miles) stretch had received ministerial approval to be re-designated. It became a motorway on 28 August 2009.

Junctions

See also 
 Roads in Ireland
 Motorways in Ireland
 National secondary road
 Regional road

References 

 Roads Act 1993 (Classification of National Roads) Order 2006 – Department of Transport
 Official site of the N2 Ashbourne Bypass/M50 Junction project
 National Roads Authority (details of projects completed, under construction, and planned on the N2, and other routes)

02
Roads in Fingal
Roads in County Meath
Roads in County Louth
Roads in County Monaghan